Suzanne Lenglen and Elizabeth Ryan successfully defended their title, defeating Winifred Beamish and Irene Peacock in the final, 6–1, 6–2 to win the ladies' doubles tennis title at the 1921 Wimbledon Championships.

Draw

Finals

Top half

The nationality of ERE Mercer is unknown.

Bottom half

References

External links

Women's Doubles
Wimbledon Championship by year – Women's doubles
Wimbledon Championships - Doubles
Wimbledon Championships - Doubles